The 1991 World Badminton Grand Prix was the ninth edition of the World Badminton Grand Prix finals. It was held in Kuala Lumpur, Malaysia, from December 11 to December 15, 1991.

Final results

References
 
 
Smash: World Grand Prix Finals, Kuala Lumpur 1991

World Grand Prix
World Badminton Grand Prix
B
Sport in Kuala Lumpur
World Badminton Grand Prix
World Badminton Grand Prix
Badminton tournaments in Malaysia